The Administration of Justice Act, or Act for the Impartial Administration of Justice, also popularly called the Monkey Act or Murder Act, was an Act of the Parliament of Great Britain. It became a law on 20 May 1774. It was one of the measures (commonly referred to as the Intolerable Acts, the Punitive Acts, or the Coercive Acts by many colonists) that was designed to secure Britain's jurisdiction over the American dominions.  As such, it is a part of the Grievances of the United States Declaration of Independence.

These Coercive Acts included the Boston Port Act, the Massachusetts Government Act, and the Quebec Act. The Act allowed the royally appointed governor to remove any acquisition placed on a royal official by a patriot, if the governor did not believe the official would have a fair trial. The Act was referred to as the "Murder Act" because the patriots believed that the official could get away with capital offences.

To assure trials were more conducive to the Crown than the prejudices of local juries, the Act granted a change of venue to another British colony or Great Britain in trials of officials charged with a crime growing out of their enforcement of the law or suppression of riots. Witnesses for both sides were also required to attend the trial and were to be compensated for their expenses.

References

External links
Text of Administration of Justice Act (1774)

Great Britain Acts of Parliament 1774
1774 in the Thirteen Colonies
Laws leading to the American Revolution
Repealed Great Britain Acts of Parliament.